Admiral Sir Richard George Onslow,  (15 April 1904 – 16 December 1975) was a Royal Navy officer who went on to be Commander-in-Chief, Plymouth.

Early life and family
Onslow was born in 1904 at Garmston (near Ironbridge), Shropshire, second child and eldest son of George Arthur Onslow, farmer, and his wife Charlotte Riou Benson, daughter of clergyman the Reverend Riou George Benson.

In 1932, Onslow married Kathleen Meriel Taylor, elder daughter of Edmund Coston Taylor, cotton manufacturer, of Bank House, Longnor, Shropshire; they had two sons.

Naval career
Educated at the Royal Naval College, Osborne and the Royal Naval College, Dartmouth, Onslow joined the Royal Navy in 1918 at the end of the First World War. He attended the Royal Naval College, Greenwich from 1934 to 1935.

At the start of the Second World War Onslow was on the Plans Division of the Naval Staff, with a combat interlude in 1940 on an unsuccessful attempt to evacuate the Belgian government and gold reserves from Bordeaux during the Fall of France, nearly becoming prisoner of the Germans. He next became captain of the destroyer  in 1941 in the role of defending Russian convoys, as well as the convoys to Malta. His services on the former convoys earned him the initial award of his Distinguished Service Order (DSO) and the Soviet Order of the Red Banner. He took over the anti-submarine training establishment HMS Osprey in 1943 and went on to be captain of the 4th Destroyer Flotilla in November, in which capacity he earned the third of his three bars to his DSO in the attack on a Japanese base at Sabang, Sumatra.

After the war Onslow attended the Imperial Defence College in London, and then became Senior Naval Officer in Northern Ireland and then, from 1948, Director of the Tactical Division at the Admiralty. After taking command of the training ship  in 1951, he became Naval Secretary in 1952. He was made Flag Officer (Flotillas) for the Home Fleet in 1955 and Flag Officer commanding the Reserve Fleet in 1956. His last appointment was as Commander-in-Chief, Plymouth in 1958. He retired in 1962.

In retirement Onslow became a Deputy Lieutenant for Shropshire on 13 April 1962 and served until his death in 1975,  He settled in Shropshire  after retirement, making his home at Ryton Grove, Great Ryton, near Dorrington, where he died on 16 December 1975.

References

|-

|-

1904 births
1975 deaths
Military personnel from Shropshire
People educated at the Royal Naval College, Osborne
Graduates of Britannia Royal Naval College
Companions of the Distinguished Service Order
Deputy Lieutenants of Shropshire
Knights Commander of the Order of the Bath
Royal Navy admirals
Royal Navy personnel of World War I
Royal Navy personnel of World War II
Graduates of the Royal Naval College, Greenwich
Graduates of the Royal College of Defence Studies